Koreasat 1 was a South Korean communications satellite launched by a Delta II rocket from Cape Canaveral Air Force Station, Florida, United States. Owned by KT Corporation.

One of the boosters of the Delta II rocket failed to separate from the first stage of the spacecraft, placing it 5,000 km short of its planned GTO apogee. The satellite had to use up 7.5 years worth of its 12-year lifetime fuel supply to make up the deficiency, shortening Koreasat 1's expected life to about 4.5 years.  In order to extend its lifetime, it gave up north–south station-keeping operating in "inclined mode." In the end, the satellite managed to function for 10 years.

The satellite was equipped with a Star 30 solid apogee motor.

It was eventually positioned in geosynchronous orbit at 116° E  operated it at 47.5° E where it was focused on Hungary. The satellite went out of service on December 16, 2005, and was moved to the graveyard orbit. As of March 9, 2007, it was located at 152.88° E drifting at 2.155° W per day.

See also 
 Asia Broadcast Satellite

References

External links 
 

Communications satellites
Satellites of South Korea
Partial satellite launch failures
Spacecraft launched in 1995
1995 in spaceflight
1995 in South Korea